Kasha NiCarra Terry (born October 21, 1983) is an American professional basketball player in the WNBA. Terry is 6'3" (1.91 m) tall and weighs 185 lbs (83.9 kg).

High school
Born in Nuremberg, Bavaria, West Germany, Terry played for Douglas County High School in Douglasville, Georgia, where she was named a WBCA All-American. She participated in the 2002 WBCA High School All-America Game where she scored eight points.

College
Terry played college basketball for the Georgia Tech Yellow Jackets.

Georgia Tech statistics
Source

Professional
She was selected by the Indiana Fever in the second round (26th pick overall) of the 2006 WNBA Draft and would play for the team until she was waived by Indiana on May 27, 2008.

On June 23, 2008, Terry was signed by the Atlanta Dream and completed the season with Atlanta until she was waived again on February 4, 2009.  During her time with Atlanta she averaged 4.6 points and 3.2 rebounds per game, and started in eight games.

During the 2008-09 WNBA off-season, Terry played for Rybnik in Poland .

In March 2009 she was added to the Seattle Storm training camp roster.

Notes

External links
 WNBA Player Profile
 Georgia Tech Profile
 Terry signed by the Dream

1983 births
Living people
African-American basketball players
American expatriate basketball people in Poland
Atlanta Dream players
Basketball players from Georgia (U.S. state)
Centers (basketball)
Georgia Tech Yellow Jackets women's basketball players
Indiana Fever draft picks
Indiana Fever players
McDonald's High School All-Americans
People from Douglasville, Georgia
Sportspeople from the Atlanta metropolitan area
Sportspeople from Nuremberg
21st-century African-American sportspeople
21st-century African-American women
20th-century African-American people
20th-century African-American women